Lynn Erickson is the American joint pseudonym used by the writing team formed by Molly Swanton and Carla Peltonen. Since 1980, they have written over 50 historical/romantic suspense novels. The pseudonym Lynn Erickson is a combination of their husbands' names.

Personal background

Molly Swanton 
Molly Swanton (née Butler) was born on September 12, 1946 in Pennsylvania. During her youth, she attended the all-girls, college preparatory school Agnes Irwin School, which is located in Rosemont, Pennsylvania. She has been serving as a literary judge for the Hammett Prize. , Swanton resides in Carbondale, Colorado, where she has lived with her husband, Terry Lynn Swanton, since 1966.

Carla Peltonen 
Carla Peltonen (née Friedenberg) was born in Buffalo, New York. She is the daughter of Jerome and Leona (née Shenker) Friedenberg. She is a 1964 graduate of the University of Rochester in New York. , Peltonen resides in Aspen, where she has lived with her husband, Erik Peltonen, since 1969.

Published works

Single novels 
 Sweet Nemesis (1980)
 The Silver Kiss (1981)
 A Woman of San Francisco (1982)
 High Country Pride (1982)
 Dawnfire (1984)
 Snowbird (1984)
 A Chance Worth Taking (1985)
 Faces of Dawn (1985)
 Lilacs (1985)
 Some Distant Shore (1985)
 Arena of Fear (1986)
 Stormswept (1986)
 A Dangerous Sentiment (1986)
 A Perfect Gem (1987)
 Tangled Dreams (1987)
 Fool's Gold (1988)
 Firecloud (1988)
 Shadow on the Sun (1989)
 In from the Cold (1989)
 West of the Sun (1990)
 Silver Lady (1991)
 The Northern Light (1991)
 A Wing and a Prayer (1992)
 Paradox (1993)
 Wildfire (1993)
 Dancing in the Dark (1994)
 Laurel and the Lawman (1994)
 Out of the Darkness (1994)
 Aspen (1995)
 Apache Springs (1995)
 Night whispers (1996)
 Upon a Midnight Clear (1997)
 The Eleventh Hour (1998)
 Ripple Effect (1999)
 Searching for Sarah (1999)
 The Ranger and the Widow (2000)
 On Thin Ice (2000)
 Fugitive Mom (2001)
 The Agent (2002)
 On the Edge (2002)
 In the Cold (2003)
 Without a Trace (2003)
 Husband and Lover (2004)
 After Hours (2004)

Timetwist series (multi-author) 
 The Last Buccaneer (1994)

Nine Months Later series (multi-author) 
 The Baby Contract (1996)

Count on a Cop series (multi-author)
 Child of Mine (1998)

Heart of the West series (multi-author)
 Courting Callie (1999)

Collections
 Clouds of Suspicion (2000)

Omnibus In Collaboration
 Rocky Mountain Men (1997) (with Debbi Bedford and Linda Randall Wisdom)
 Something to Hide (1999) (with Tess Gerritsen)

References

External links 
 Lynn Erickson at Fantastic Fiction
 Lynn Erickson at Berkley/Jove Authors

American romantic fiction writers
Living people
Year of birth missing (living people)
American women novelists
Women romantic fiction writers
Agnes Irwin School alumni
21st-century American women